Logos: A Journal of Modern Society and Culture is an American academic journal established in 2002 and edited by Michael J. Thompson. It is published quarterly and features articles that seek to foster critical dialogues on issues ranging from arts, politics, foreign affairs, culture, social sciences, to the humanities, as well as original fiction and poetry.

Logos was launched "to resurrect eroding democratic principles, concerns with social justice, and the broad-minded cosmopolitanism originally associated with The Enlightenment and then with the great progressive movements of modernity."

References

External links
 

Cultural journals
Critical theory
Publications established in 2002
English-language journals
Quarterly journals
2002 establishments in the United States